The second edition of the Champs-Élysées Film Festival was held from 12 to 18 June 2013, with actors Olivier Martinez and Julie Gayet presiding. Struck by Lightning, by Brian Daddelly, was screened at the Opening Ceremony, while Shari Springer Berman and Robert Pulcini's Imogene was shown at the Closing Ceremony. Along with its competitive Official Selections for American feature-length films, American Shorts and French Shorts, the Festival presented a wide selection of important American and French movie premieres, a 7-film Brad Pitt retrospective to mark the release of World War Z and The TCM Cinema Essentials, a thirteen-film selection of American and French classics. Three Audience Prizes (Best American Feature-Length Film, Best American Short Film, Best French Short Film) were presented during the Closing Ceremony, held at the Publicis Cinema.

Official Selection of American Independent Films

 I Am I, directed by Jocelyn Towne
 Blood Pressure, directed by Sean Garrity
 Hide Your Smiling Faces, directed by Daniel Patrick Carbone
 How To Make Money Selling Drugs, directed by Matthew Cooke
 Any Day Now, directed by Travis Fine
 Coldwater, directed by Vincent Grashaw
 Decoding Annie Parker, directed by Steven Bernstein
 It Felt Like Love, directed by Eliza Hittman
 Thanks for Sharing, directed by Stuart Blumberg

Official Selection of Short Films

French Shorts Competitive Selection

French Shorts Selection
 Désolée Pour Hier Soir, directed by Hortense Gelinet
 Suzanne, directed by Wilfried Méance
 La Voix De Kate Moss, directed by Tatiana-Margaux Bonhomme
 La Mère Morte, directed by Thierry Charrier 
 Rétention, directed by Thomas Kruithof
 Le Père Noël Est Mort, directed by Valentin Marro
 Nous Sommes Tous Des Êtres Penchés, directed by Simon Lelouch

La Femis Shorts Selection
 Faux Frères, directed by Lucas Delangle
 Hier J’Étais Deux, directed by Sylvain Coisne
 3 Secondes Et Demie, directed by Édouard Beaucamp
 Les Filles De La Côte d’Azur, directed by Axel Victor

American Shorts Competitive Selection

American Shorts Selection
 Pearl Was Here, directed by Kate Marks
 The Captain, directed by Nash Edgerton & Spencer Susser
 Mobile Homes, directed by Vladimir de Fontenay
 Palimpsest, directed by Michael Tyburski
 Cupid, directed by John Dion

Columbia University Film Festival Shorts Selection
 Blackwood, directed by Natasha Johns-Messenger
 Penny Dreadful, directed by Shane Atkinson
 Soul Winner, directed by Jennifer Gerber 
 Asternauts, directed by Marta Masferre 
 The Dark, directed by Justin P. Lange

USC School of Cinematic Arts Shorts Selection
 Elie’s Overcoat, directed by Erik Howell
 Midnight, directed by Talia Lidia
 Shaya, directed by Amir Noorani
 Tina For President, directed by Carmen Emmi
 Waking Up, directed by Yuta Okamura

American Film Institute Shorts Selection
 113 Degrees, directed by Sabrina Doyle
 Goldenstate, directed by Moshe Sayada
 Machsom, directed by Joel Novoa
 Splendor, directed by Eric Yandoc

New York University Tisch School of the Arts Shorts Selection
 The Hunter and the Swan..., directed by Emily Carmichael
 Deja vu, directed by Alexis Gambis
 And Winter Slow, directed by Brian Lannin
 Doubles With Slight Pepper, directed by Ian Harnarine

US in Progress Official Selection
 Beneath the Harvest Sky, directed by Gita Pullapilly
 B.F.E., directed by Shawn Telford
 Children, directed by Jaffe Zinn
 Ping Pong Summer, directed by Michael Tully
 I Believe in Unicorns, directed by Leah Meyerhoff
 1982, directed by Tommy Olivier

Awards
Audience Prizes
 Best American Independent Film: How To Make Money Selling Drugs, directed by Matthew Cooke
 Best American Short Film: Penny Dreadful, directed by Shane Atkinson
 Best French Short Film: Nous Sommes Tous Des Êtres Penchés, directed by Simon Lelouch

US in Progress
 US in Progress Paris Award: 1982, directed by Tommy Olivier

Festival theaters
 Le Balzac
 Gaumont Champs-Elysées
 Le Lincoln
 MK2 Grand Palais
 Publicis Cinéma
 UGC George V

See also

References

External links 
 
 
 

Champs-Élysées Film Festival
2013 in Paris
2013 in French cinema
2013 film festivals
2013 festivals in Europe